Little Albany is an unincorporated community near the coast in Lincoln County, Oregon, United States.

References

Unincorporated communities in Lincoln County, Oregon
Unincorporated communities in Oregon